Ida Barr (born Maud Barlow, 17 January 1882 – 17 December 1967) was an English music hall singer.

Life and career
Barr was born at Regent's Park Barracks, London on 17 January 1882. Her father, William Barlow, is believed to have been a soldier, although Maud described him as a retired civil servant on her marriage certificate.

She made her stage debut in 1898 as a chorus girl at the Theatre Royal, Belfast. Initially calling herself Maud Laverne, she first used the stage-name Ida Barr in 1908 at London's Bedford Theatre.

Barr married comedian Samuel 'Gus' Harris (billed as "the only Yiddisher Scotsman in the Irish Fusiliers"), but the marriage failed within a few years, with Maud soon sailing to New York. Achieving some success in America, Barr returned to England a premier singer of ragtime songs, popularising in Britain the songs "Oh, You Beautiful Doll" (Ayer & Brown; 1910) and "Everybody's Doing It" (Berlin; 1911).

She toured worldwide, earning good money, but was over-generous and failed to save. She became in her old age reliant on welfare benefits, living in a small flat off the Charing Cross Road in London. Writer and broadcaster Daniel Farson, a music hall enthusiast, took it upon himself to extend a helping hand, bringing Barr to a new (or nostalgic) audience on record and television. It was through Farson, too, that variety entertainer Danny La Rue arranged a benefit concert for Barr.

Death
Ida Barr died on 17 December 1967 in London.

Film and TV credits
Barr's screen credits span the years 1936 to 1966.

Film credits
Happy Days Are Here Again (1936)
Laugh It Off (1940)
Let the People Sing (1942)

TV credits
Music Hall Cavalcade (1937)
Stars and Garters (1965)
Love Story (1966)

Trivia
Actress Elsa Lanchester performed in her youth a snake dancing routine with Ida Barr.
Ida Barr's name was appropriated more than 40 years after her death by Christopher Green for an unrelated, non-tribute drag act.
Ida Barr was (through her marriage to Gus Harris) a great-aunt of actress and singer Anita Harris.

References

External links

Photographs of Ida Barr held by the National Portrait Gallery
Photographs of Ida Barr held by Getty Images
Photograph of Ida Barr held by the National Library of Australia
Ida Barr discography on Discogs
Ida Barr: Everybody's Doing It Now/Oh, You Beautiful Doll on Spotify
Ida Barr: Everybody's Doing It Now/Oh, You Beautiful Doll on Deezer
Lyrics to "Oh, You Beautiful Doll" as sung by Ida Barr

1882 births
1967 deaths
Music hall performers
Singers from London
20th-century English women singers
20th-century English singers